Defending champion Andre Agassi defeated Pete Sampras in the final, 3–6, 6–2, 6–3 to win the men's singles tennis title at the 1995 Canadian Open.

Seeds
A champion seed is indicated in bold text while text in italics indicates the round in which that seed was eliminated.

  Andre Agassi (champion)
  Pete Sampras (final)
  Michael Chang (quarterfinals)
  Yevgeny Kafelnikov (quarterfinals)
  Goran Ivanišević (third round)
  Wayne Ferreira (third round)
  Michael Stich (quarterfinals)
  Marc Rosset (second round)
  Sergi Bruguera (third round)
  Jim Courier (third round)
  Stefan Edberg (second round)
  Thomas Enqvist (semifinals)
  Todd Martin (third round)
  David Wheaton (first round)
  Jason Stoltenberg (second round)
  Alexander Volkov (first round)

Draw

Finals

Top half

Section 1

Section 2

Bottom half

Section 3

Section 4

External links
 1995 Canadian Open draw

Men's Singles